"Kidnapped!" is the fifth episode of the second series of the 1990s British comedy television series Jeeves and Wooster. It is also called "The Mysterious Stranger".

In the US, "Kidnapped!" was one of five episodes of Jeeves and Wooster that were not aired as part of the original broadcast of the television series on Masterpiece Theatre, though all episodes were made available on US home video releases.

Background
Adapted from Thank You, Jeeves. Chuffnell Regis parts were filmed in Clovelly, Devon.

Cast
 Jeeves – Stephen Fry
 Bertie Wooster – Hugh Laurie
 "Chuffy", Lord Chuffnell – Matthew Solon 
 Pauline Stoker – Sharon Holm
 J. Washburn Stoker – Manning Redwood
 Dwight Stoker – James Holland
 Myrtle Pongleton – Fidelis Morgan
 Seabury Pongleton – Edward Holmes
 Sir Roderick Glossop – Roger Brierley
 Lady Glossop – Jane Downs
 Barmy Fotheringay-Phipps – Martin Clunes
 Oofy Prosser – Richard Dixon
 Sgt. Voules – Dave Atkins
 Dobson – William Waghorn
 Aunt Hilda – Cynthia Grenville
 Station Master – Gordon Salkilld
 Drones Porter – Michael Ripper

Plot
Bertie's club, the Drones Club, are electing a new dining committee chairman. Bertie wishes to be elected, but discovers that no one with a criminal record can stand. The trip results in startling results, including an encounter with several Drones in blackface.

Pauline Stoker is being stalked by a mysterious stranger. Bertie, always chivalrous, is called upon to protect her on her way back to Chuffnell Regis.

Because Lord Chuffnell ("Chuffy") cannot get permission to turn Chuffnell Hall into a hotel, Pauline tries to persuade Sir Roderick Glossop to turn it into a sanatorium. Glossop initially views Bertie as mentally unstable.

Bertie is kidnapped by Pauline Stoker's father, who wants Bertie to marry his daughter. But Bertie escapes by posing as one of the Barmy's blackface musicians.

All musicians and Sir Roderick, Stoker and Bertie are arrested in blackface. Sir Roderick, Stoker and Bertie become civil to each other and they patch up their differences after having been obliged to blacken their faces for different reasons.

And they get in front of Chuffy as the local magistrate, who releases the prisoners Sir Roderick, Stoker and Bertie. Sir Roderick, Stoker and Bertie are going undercover using snazzy aliases so that they aren't recognized: Sir Roderick as Alfred Trotsky, Stoker as Frederick Aloisius Lenin and Bertie as Dr. Crippen. But all musicians of Bertie's club, the Drones, are punished by Chuffy. The musicians of Bertie's club, the Drones, now have all a criminal record.

Chuffy as the local magistrate says: ″... you, Alfred Trotsky, and you, Frederick Aloisius Lenin, were led astray. You are discharged. But as for the rest of you: Boko Disraeli, Oofy Lloyd George, Barmy, Lord Tennyson, and the rest—not only have you been guilty of a breach of the peace of considerable magnitude, I also strongly suspect that you have given false names and addresses! You are each fined the sum of five pounds... Quiet, Dr. Crippen″

See also
 List of Jeeves and Wooster characters

References

External links

Jeeves and Wooster episodes
1991 British television episodes